The Washington metropolitan area has several important lakes and reservoirs. The U.S. Army Corps of Engineers created several of the reservoirs in the Washington D.C. area.

Lakes
Lake Accotink
Lake Anne
Lake Artemesia
Babcock Lakes (no longer exist)
Lake Barcroft, Virginia
Lake Bernard Frank
Lake Braddock
Burke Lake
Culler Lake
Lake Fairfax Park
Kingman Lake
Little Seneca Lake
Lake Manassas
Lake Mooney
Lake Needwood
Tidal Basin

Reservoirs
Breckenridge Reservoir
Dalecarlia Reservoir
Georgetown Reservoir
McMillan Reservoir
Occoquan Reservoir
Rocky Gorge Reservoir

References

Lakes of Washington, D.C.
Bodies of water of Washington, D.C.
Water in Washington, D.C.
Water in the United States